Maina is a name with multiple independent origins.

Maina is a name of agesets among some East African communities (mostly Bantu)

To a lesser extent it is used as a name among the Abagusii (or Bantu Kosova) ethnic group.

It is an Italian surname that belongs to the region of the Italian Alps, as well as a Latvian language personal name, descended from the Finnish language Maini.
 
Maina/Moyna/Mayna is an Assamese nickname in India. The term is also used as a term of endearment.

Maina/Mena/Meena/Mina is an Indian tribe.

Mayna in the Philippines girls born on the first of May are named after the month with the month with addition of two letters "na" in the end of the name.

Maina is a name attributed to sons and grandsons of kings in the North Eastern part of Nigeria Majorly in Borno and Yobe States. The likes of Arc. Kabiru Maina who served as Chief Architect in Kano State And Director of Public Building in the Ministry of the Federal Capital Territory (MFCT) is the son of Mukhtar Ali (Malum Maina) and a grandson of King Ali (Sarki Lupta Ali) of Mandiragirau of Biu LGA of Borno State.

Nigeria
Maina is a name of Nigerian origin that may refer to:

Maina Maaji Lawan (born 1954), is a Former Nigerian politician and Now a Farmer, He is Currently the CEO of Dansarki Farms
Adamu Maina Waziri (born 1952), Nigerian politician and Minister of Police Affairs
Hajiya Zainab Maina (born 1948), Nigerian politician and Minister of Women Affairs and Social Development
Mohammed Maina, Nigerian politician and former governor of Borno State

Kenya
Maina is a name of Kenyan origin that in line with the Kikuyu customs is derived certain age group or age set. It may refer to

Charles Gitonga Maina (born 1976), Kenyan film actor and basketball player
Ephraim Maina, Kenyan politician and Member of Parliament for Safina
Esther Wanjiru Maina (born 1977), Kenyan long-distance runner and 1998 Commonwealth Games champion
James Maina Boi (1954–2004), Kenyan middle-distance runner and 1979 African champion
James Maina Kamau, Kenyan politician and Member of the National Assembly for the Party of National Unity
Joseph Maina Mungai (1932–2003), Kenyan medical academic and researcher
Leonard Mucheru Maina (born 1978), Kenyan long-distance runner formerly competing for Bahrain
Maina wa Kinyatti (born bef. 1982), Kenyan Marxist historian and former political prisoner
Anthony Maina Njoroge (2000 – ), Kenyan academic and aspiring Civil Engineer and Computer Scientist.

Others

Maina Gielgud (born 1945), former British dancer and dance administrator
Maïna Kataki (1923–2011), French-Indian feminist author
Maina Sage (born 1975), French politician
Maina Sunuwar, Nepalese murder victim in 2004
Pete Maina (born 1963), American professional fisherman and personality

Notes

Kenyan names